Eboda chloroclistis is a species of moth of the family Tortricidae. It is found in Indonesia (Sulawesi).

References

Moths described in 1964
Tortricini
Moths of Indonesia
Taxa named by Józef Razowski